Niemba is a town in the Democratic Republic of Congo, Katanga Province. It is situated on the Lukuga River, a tributary of the Lualaba river. The population is around 1,800. It is connected by rail to Kalemie.

See also
 Niemba Ambush

References

Tanganyika Province